The Maltese palpigrade (Eukoenenia christiani, known as  in Maltese), endemic to the Maltese Islands, comes from the order Palpigradi, a rather primitive order of arachnids. There are 80 species of palpigrade worldwide (see the article Palpigradi). They are small and eyeless with a long tail-like structure.

Taxonomy and naming
The Maltese palpigrade was first discovered in 1988 when a specimen was found in a cave in the Girgenti Valley (Malta). Since then, no news of another specimen has been heard of making the Maltese palpigrade a very rare species.

Description

See also
Endemic Maltese wildlife

References

Palpigradi
Fauna of Malta
Animals described in 1988
Endemic fauna of Malta